Pocono Raceway (formerly Pocono International Raceway), also known as The Tricky Triangle, is a superspeedway located in the Pocono Mountains in Long Pond, Pennsylvania. It is the site of three NASCAR national series races and an ARCA Menards Series event in July: a NASCAR Cup Series race with support events by the NASCAR Xfinity Series and NASCAR Camping World Truck Series. From 1971 to 1989, and from 2013 to 2019, the track also hosted an Indy Car race, currently sanctioned by the IndyCar Series. Additionally, from 1982 to 2021, it hosted two NASCAR Cup Series races, with the traditional first date being removed for 2022.

Pocono is one of the few NASCAR tracks not owned by either NASCAR or Speedway Motorsports, the dominant track owners in NASCAR. Pocono CEO Nick Igdalsky and president Ben May are members of the family-owned Mattco Inc, started by Joseph II and Rose Mattioli.  Mattco also owns South Boston Speedway in South Boston, Virginia.

Outside NASCAR and IndyCar Series races, Pocono is used throughout the year by the Stock Car Experience, Bertil Roos Driving School, Sports Car Club of America (SCCA) as well as many other clubs and organizations. The triangular track also has three separate infield sections of racetrack – the north course, east course and south course. Each of these infield sections use separate portions of the track or can be combined for longer and more technical course configurations. In total Pocono Raceway has offers 22 different road course configurations ranging from .5 miles to 3.65 miles in length. During regular non-race weekends, multiple clubs or driving schools can use the track simultaneously by running on different infield sections. All of the infield sections can also be run in either clockwise or counter clockwise direction which doubles the 22 course configuration to 44 total course options.

Track configuration
The track was designed by 1959 and 1962 Indianapolis 500 winner Rodger Ward. Pocono Raceway has a unique design, as each turn is modeled after a turn at a different track.
Turn one (14° banking) - modeled after Trenton Speedway
Turn two (8° banking) also known as the "Tunnel Turn" - modeled after Indianapolis Motor Speedway
Turn three (6° banking) - modeled after the Milwaukee Mile
The circuit is sometimes considered a tri-oval, but the turns are much more severe than those of a more typical tri-oval such as Daytona and other intermediate speedways. An additional complication is that the three turns are in no way the same, nor are any of the three straights identical in length. The banking of each turn is considerably less than on many other long superspeedways.

Although the track is long [], the sharp nature of the turns and the low banking tend to make the average speeds on NASCAR racecars lower than at other tracks of similar lengths. Because of its unique characteristics, Pocono is sometimes referred to as a roval (an oval track that behaves like a road course). Others refer to Pocono as a modified road course, due to the use of shifting gears to handle the range between the slowest turn and the fastest straightaway.

The unique design makes the setup of the car and the crew's ability to make chassis adjustments more crucial than at many other tracks. Often it is the difference between a winning performance and a poor performance.

Shifting
In 1991 some drivers in NASCAR (notably Mark Martin) experimented with shifting gears down the long, 3,740 foot front straight. The ratios for third gear and fourth gear were set so that third was used for most of the circuit (including the turns), and fourth was used for the later part of the long front stretch. This method provided a better RPM range around the track and improved overall lap times. By 1993, the entire field was shifting at Pocono, and using a special transmission (manufactured by Jerico) to shift gears without using the clutch. Shifting was criticized by some drivers (Rusty Wallace stated that the Jerico took away the ability to pass cars while Terry Labonte called it "a pain in the butt"). However, the practice continued until 2005, when a new gear rule eliminated the effectiveness of shifting. In 2011 the gear rule was changed again, and shifting returned to Pocono.

IndyCar races at Pocono

From 1971 to 1989, first USAC and then the CART IndyCar World Series held a  race at Pocono as part of the IndyCar 500-mile Triple Crown. Following the 1989 race, however, the track was criticized for its roughness, lack of catch fencing and runoff areas. After continuing squabbles between the management and the sanctioning body, it was removed from the IndyCar schedule.

In the wake of a meeting between Pocono CEO Brandon Igdalsky and IndyCar CEO Randy Bernard at the 2012 Honda Grand Prix of St. Petersburg, speculation developed throughout 2012 regarding the possibility of a 2013 IndyCar Series race at Pocono Raceway. On the September 30, 2012, edition of Speed Channel's WindTunnel with Dave Despain, Bernard officially confirmed that the IndyCar Series would return to Pocono with a 400-mile race on July 7, 2013. Further acknowledging Pocono's place in IndyCar history, Bernard also announced that from 2013, the Indianapolis 500, Pocono IndyCar 400 and MAVTV 500 at California's Auto Club Speedway would mark a revival of IndyCar's all-oval Triple Crown. A $1 million bonus will be paid to a driver who wins all three races in a single season. Thanks to the popularity of their return to Pocono, they announced that they would lengthen the race to its original distance of 500-miles/200-laps. The 2014 event marked the first 500-mile IndyCar race at Pocono since 1989. It also became the fastest 500-mile race in motorsports history as Juan Pablo Montoya completed the race at an average speed of 202.402 MPH, breaking Mark Martin's record that he established at Talladega Superspeedway in May 1997.

During the 2015 ABC Supply 500, Andretti Autosport driver Justin Wilson was struck in the head by Sage Karam's nose cone after he crashed in turn 1 late in the race.  Wilson died from his injuries on August 24, 2015, the day after the race, at Lehigh Valley Hospital–Cedar Crest in Allentown, Pennsylvania. On lap 7 of the 2018 edition, Ryan Hunter-Reay and rookie Robert Wickens collided at the exit of the Tunnel Turn while battling for 3rd, that saw Wickens' car fly into the catch fence, necessitating a lengthy red flag. Wickens survived the crash, but was paralysed from the waist down. In 2019, racing driver Felix Rosenqvist was hospitalised following a five-car collision, resulting in calls by Wickens for IndyCar to remove Pocono from the schedule.

On September 1, 2019 the IndyCar Series released the 2020 schedule, and they will not be returning to Pocono in 2020. No reason was specified, and Pocono's date was moved to Richmond Raceway.

Race of Champions
From 1977 to 1991, Pocono Raceway hosted the Race of Champions Modified race. From 1977 to 1979, the race was held on the  triangular superspeedway; from 1980 onward, the three-quarter-mile infield oval was used. Richie Evans and George Kent were the leading winners, each winning two of the fifteen RoC events at Pocono.  In 1992, the Race of Champions was moved to Flemington Raceway.

Notable events

1971: Schaefer Beer agrees to sponsor Pocono's Indycar 500.
July 3, 1971: Mark Donohue wins the inaugural USAC Pocono 500. NASCAR Grand National regulars Donnie Allison and Cale Yarborough finish 28th and 32nd respectively.
July 1972: Massive flooding from the remnants of Hurricane Agnes forced postponement of the Schaefer 500 to late July, in conjunction with USAC's Pennsylvania 500 for stock cars; Pocono became the first track to hold back-to-back 500 mile races in one weekend. Joe Leonard won the Schaefer 500 while Roger McCluskey drove a Plymouth Superbird to win the Pennsylvania 500.
 July 20 to July 29, 1973: The Pocono State Fair offered performances by Bob Hope, Johnny Cash, Mac Davis, the Jackson Five, Helen Reddy, Sammy Davis Jr., Lawrence Welk, and other stars.
August 4, 1974: Richard Petty wins the inaugural Pocono 500.
August 1, 1976: Petty scores a popular win after David Pearson blows a tire with two laps to go.
June 21, 1981: A. J. Foyt wins the USAC Van Scoy Diamond Mines 500. This is the final IndyCar race that USAC sanctioned at Pocono. From 1982–1989 the IndyCar races would be sanctioned by CART. It was also Foyt's final IndyCar win.
August 15, 1982: Rick Mears wins the CART Domino's Pizza Pocono 500, the first CART IndyCar sanctioned race.
1985: Bill Elliott sweeps both Pocono cup races.
1986–1987: Tim Richmond wins three Pocono races in a row. The third and last was the spring race in 1987. Richmond had just returned after missing the first part of the season battling HIV. Richmond was the first HIV positive race car driver to win a major race, this wasn't revealed for nearly four years.
July 20, 1986: Richmond recovers from a crash and beats Ricky Rudd and Geoff Bodine in a photo finish.
June 19, 1988: On the opening lap of the 1988 Miller High Life 500, Bobby Allison suffered career-ending injuries when he spun and was T-boned by the No. 63 of Jocko Maggiacomo.
August 21, 1988: Bobby Rahal wins the CART Quaker State 500. This was Bobby's only win of the season. It was his final win with the Truesports IndyCar team, he would leave the team at the end of the season to join Team Kraco (incidentally at the end of 1989 Team Kraco merged with Galles racing to form Kraco-Galles). This was also the only Indycar win ever scored for the Judd engine.
August 20, 1989: Danny Sullivan wins the final CART Pocono 500. This was the final year of the IndyCar 500 mile triple crown.
1999: Bobby Labonte sweeps both races at Pocono.
June 18, 2000: Jeremy Mayfield knocked Dale Earnhardt out of his way coming out of Turn Three on the last lap to score his third career Winston Cup win.
July 28, 2002: Steve Park and Dale Earnhardt Jr. became entangled exiting turn one, and both cars slammed into the inside wall, causing Park's vehicle to go airborne over the hood of Earnhardt's car and barrel roll.  The incident resulted in a lengthy red flag to repair the old-fashioned highway barrier (a guardrail with wooden supports) that lined the inside of the track in that area.  Soon afterward, all outdated barriers at the track were replaced with sturdier walls. The race was shortened by 25 laps due to this repair and rain delays throughout the race that pushed the race towards darkness. Bill Elliott won the race.
2004: The SAFER barrier is installed in all the turns.
2006: NASCAR's Rookie of the Year Denny Hamlin sweeps both races of the 2006 season at Pocono.
August 5, 2007: Kurt Busch dominates the Pennsylvania 500 by leading 175 of the 200 laps. A record that can't be broken because of the distance reduction that makes both races at Pocono 160 laps instead of 200.
June 6, 2008:  Pocono Raceway becomes one of the first NASCAR tracks in the country to utilize barcode-based ticketing.
June 2008 James Hylton becomes the oldest driver to race at Pocono in the ARCA series.
August 2, 2008: Frank Kimmel, a 9-time ARCA Re/Max Series champion, was injured after a 3-car crash on lap 68 of a Pocono race that involved his car being clipped and slamming into the backstretch wall on the driver's side, going airborne as a result. Kimmel suffered a partially torn sphincter and pulled groin, spending the night in a local hospital before being released.
June 7, 2009: Tony Stewart wins the 2009 Pocono 500.  In doing so, he becomes the first person who both owns and drives his car to win in the NASCAR Cup Series since Ricky Rudd in 1998. The double-file restart shootout style restart procedure was introduced at the race for the first time at a NASCAR Cup Series points race.
June 6, 2010: With two laps to go, Kevin Harvick turned Joey Logano, setting up a green white checkered finish. On the last lap, Kasey Kahne, who had been one of the fastest cars in the race found himself in the back of the pack on late race restart due to different pit strategies playing out, got a huge run on teammate A.J. Allmendinger and Allmendinger proceeded to force a flying Kahne going a good 10 mph quicker, into the grass causing him to spin and he was hit by Mark Martin and Greg Biffle, and flew through the air, landing on top of the wall and completely destroying several hedges outside the track due to the absence of a catch fence and he was hit by Jeff Gordon and several others as his car came to a rest on the track, due to the track being blocked. Both Kasey Kahne and Greg Biffle said that the wreck was Allmendinger's fault as he had forced a much faster Kasey Kahne into the wet grass, causing him to spin to the right across the track in front of a little over half the field. Kahne stated that he would not speak to Allmendinger and that he usually did not anyway because there had been tension between the two for a while. Kahne did not like the way his young teammate drove, and during a night race at Phoenix the previous year Kasey Kahne was catching Allmendinger on the track, when Allmendinger began weaving to the left and right as though he was taunting teammate Kasey Kahne, prompting Kahne to say over the team radio "What the Hell's Allmendinger doing?!".  Denny Hamlin cruised home to his third victory at Pocono.
July 31, 2010: The Camping World Truck Series raced for the first time at Pocono in the Pocono Mountains 125. It used a multi-truck qualifying format in which successive trucks were sent out 25 seconds apart. Elliott Sadler won the inaugural Truck Series event at Pocono.
August 1, 2010: Jimmie Johnson clipped Kurt Busch on the Long Pond Straightaway and Busch spun across the track. Behind him, Elliott Sadler was turned by teammate A. J. Allmendinger and collided with the inside guardrail so savagely it ripped the engine out of the car and threw it to the entrance of the Tunnel Turn. Sadler's wrecked car slid to a stop back on the track and despite being shaken and suffering some pain, he would climb out of the car slowly and was able to walk to the ambulance. The crash was recorded as the hardest hit in NASCAR history. This wreck (along with Kasey Kahne's crash in the spring race) aroused concern over the safety of the track and renovations were made to improve safety, adding SAFER barriers to the inside retaining wall and a catch fence on the Long Pond Straightaway. Greg Biffle won the race, days after owner Jack Roush was involved in a plane crash.
June 12, 2011: Jeff Gordon scored his 84th NASCAR Cup Series win, tying Bobby Allison and Darrell Waltrip for 3rd on the all-time win list.
August 7, 2011: Brad Keselowski won the NASCAR Cup Series race just three days after sustaining an injury in a test crash at Road Atlanta. This would be the final 500-mile NASCAR race at Pocono Raceway when two days later NASCAR announced that starting in 2012 both NASCAR Cup events would be changed from 500 to 400 miles.
October 4, 2011: Improvement projects were announced, including repaving the track, installing a new flag stand, making the pit stalls concrete, and adding a new pit wall. This was the first time the track has been repaved since 1995. The new flag stand came from an incident in which a Camping World Truck Series hauler clipped the old stand and destroyed it in August 2011.
January 26, 2012: Founder and chairman of the board for Pocono Raceway, Joseph Mattioli, dies after a long illness.
January 31, 2012: After a viewing and a funeral, Mattioli took his last lap around Pocono Raceway.
April 25–26, 2012: Pocono Raceway hosts a Goodyear tire test for NASCAR Cup Series and Camping World Truck series teams, the first event held following the repaving project.
June 10, 2012: Joey Logano wins from the Pole in the first Cup race after the repave and the first 400-mile Cup event. 
August 4, 2012: Chad Hackenbracht wins his only career Arca race at the track beating out Brennan Poole
August 5, 2012: Jeff Gordon clinches his first win of the 2012 season and extends his all-time leading six wins at Pocono in the 2012 Pennsylvania 400 after the race ended due to a rainstorm. A fan was killed by a lightning strike, while nine others were injured.
October 2012: Pocono Raceway suffers damage from Hurricane Sandy, such as the steeple being destroyed, the Victory Tower roof being partially missing, and power outages.
June 8, 2013: Chase Elliott wins the Pocono ARCA 200, becoming the youngest ARCA Racing Series superspeedway winner in series history at the age of 17 years and 6 months.
June 9, 2013: Jimmie Johnson from the Pole wins after leading 128 of the 160 laps.
July 7, 2013: Scott Dixon wins the 2013 Pocono IndyCar 400, the first Indy car race at Pocono since 1989.
July 6, 2014: Juan Pablo Montoya in the Team Penske number 2 car won the Pocono IndyCar 500 from the pole. The race would set an international motorsports record as the, "Fastest 500 Mile Race in History".
August 3, 2014: Dale Earnhardt Jr. wins the GoBowling.com 400, becoming the most recent NASCAR driver to sweep Pocono's Cup Series events in a season.
August 23, 2015: Ryan Hunter-Reay wins the ABC Supply 500 IndyCar race. On lap 179, race leader Sage Karam spun and crashed in Turn 1 and a piece of debris from his car struck Justin Wilson on the head, knocking Wilson unconscious and sending him into the wall. Wilson was airlifted to Lehigh Valley Hospital–Cedar Crest in Allentown, where he died the following day.
June 4, 2016: The NASCAR Xfinity Series races at Pocono for the first time in the Pocono Green 250. Kyle Larson would go on to win the race after persistent rain showers ended the race after 53 of the scheduled 100 laps.
August 1, 2016: Chris Buescher gets his first career win in the fog shortened 2016 Pennsylvania 400 after stretching his fuel window.
June 10, 2017: The second running of the Pocono Green 250 goes the full 100-lap/250-mile distance with Brad Keselowski making a last-lap pass on the inaugural race's winner Kyle Larson on the backstretch.
June 11, 2017: Ryan Blaney holds off Kevin Harvick to win his first-ever NASCAR Cup Series race in the 2017 Axalta presents the Pocono 400.
June 2, 2018: Kyle Busch becomes the first and only driver to date to win in all three top divisions of NASCAR at Pocono Raceway after winning the third running of the Pocono Green 250. He also led 64 of the 100 laps, which is the record as of today.
August 19, 2018: Alexander Rossi dominated and won the ABC Supply 500 IndyCar race. On lap 7, Robert Wickens and Ryan Hunter-Reay made contact in turn 2, which sent Wickens' car into the catchfence and caused a multicar wreck which also involved James Hinchcliffe, Takuma Sato and Pietro Fittipaldi. The race was red-flagged for two hours to repair the catchfence while Wickens was airlifted to Lehigh Valley Hospital–Cedar Crest with injuries to his legs, spine and right arm in addition to pulmonary contusion. Wickens survived but is still recovering from paralysis sustained as a result of his injuries.
August 18, 2019: IndyCar driver Felix Rosenqvist is hospitalized following a five-car collision.
September 1, 2019: IndyCar releases their 2020 schedule, with Pocono being removed from the schedule in favor of Richmond Raceway.
June 27–28, 2020: First ever doubleheader weekend that was planned the year before. Saturday June 27 consisted of the Truck Series event and first Cup race that was 325 miles. Sunday June 28 consisted of the Xfinity event and second Cup race that was 350 miles. Due to rain, the Truck event was postponed to the 28th, and the second day marked the first time in NASCAR history that all 3 series raced on the same track on the same day. The Truck event was run at 9:30 a.m., the Xfinity event at 12:30 p.m., and the second Cup race at 4 p.m.. Second Cup race was delayed due to lightning and rain and concluded at 8:43 p.m., five minutes past sunset. The winners were Brandon Jones, Chase Briscoe, Kevin Harvick, and Denny Hamlin.
June 29, 2020: Rose Mattioli died at age 92.
July 24, 2022: NASCAR doubleheader event discontinued in favor of only one 400-mile race at the track.

Races

Current
NASCAR Cup Series
M&M's Fan Appreciation 400
NASCAR Xfinity Series
Explore the Pocono Mountains 225
NASCAR Camping World Truck Series
CRC Brakleen 150
ARCA Menards Series
General Tire Delivers 200

Former
CART IndyCar
Pocono 500 (1982–1989)
IndyCar Series
ABC Supply 500 (2013–2019)
IMSA GT Championship
Grand Prix at Pocono (1981–1985)
Indy Lights
Pocono Indy Lights 100 (1986–1989, 2013–2014)
NASCAR Cup Series
Pocono Organics CBD 325
NASCAR Whelen Modified Tour
Race of Champions (1985–1991)
NASCAR Sportsman Division (1991–1995)
SCCA Motorola Cup (1998)
SCCA/USAC Formula 5000 Championship (1975–1976)
Trans-Am Series (1975–1976)
USAC IndyCar
Pocono 500 (1971–1981)
USAC Mini Indy Series (1979–1980)
USAC Stock Car
 Pennsylvania 500 (1971–1974)

Records
NASCAR qualifying: Kyle Larson, August 1, 2014
NASCAR race: Jeff Gordon, 145.384 mph (233.972 km/h), June 12, 2011
ARCA qualifying: Brennan Poole, July 21, 2012
ARCA race: Corey LaJoie, 162.221 mph (261.069 km/h), June 3, 2013
CART qualifying: Emerson Fittipaldi, 1989
CART race: Danny Sullivan, 1989
IndyCar qualifying: Juan Pablo Montoya, July 5, 2014 *Overall track record
IndyCar race: Juan Pablo Montoya, July 6, 2014 *Overall Track Record
Most open-wheel wins: A. J. Foyt 4, 1973, 1975, 1979, 1981
Most wins in one series: Tim Steele, 9, ARCA Racing Series

Lap Records
The fastest official race lap records at Pocono Raceway (formerly Pocono International Raceway) are listed as:

NASCAR Cup Series records

(As of 28/06/20)

* from minimum five starts

Environmental initiatives

In July 2010 Pocono Raceway began the installation of a 3 megawatt solar photovoltaics system. Upon completion the racetrack became the largest solar-powered sports facility in the world. The "solar farm" encompasses approximately 25 acres and consists of almost 40,000 solar modules, which satisfies the energy consumption for the entire racing complex and will help power 1,000 homes. By December 2010, with less than four months in operation, the Pocono system had surpassed the 1,000,000 kilowatt hour production mark. Over the next 20 years the system is expected to produce in excess of 72 million kilowatt hours and offset 3,100 metric tons of carbon dioxide annually. Sheep are used to keep the grass to a low level.

See also
List of NASCAR race tracks
Eriez Speedway, Erie, Pennsylvania
Lake Erie Speedway

Notes

References

External links

Pocono Raceway Official Site

RacingCircuit.info's history of Pocono Raceway
Pocono Raceway Page on NASCAR.com
RacewayReport.com: Pocono Raceway Page – Local area information, track specs, mapping, news and more.
2008 Pocono Raceway Schedule
Trackpedia guide to driving this track 

Pocono Raceway Seating Chart

Champ Car circuits
IndyCar Series tracks
NASCAR tracks
Motorsport venues in Pennsylvania
ARCA Menards Series tracks
Pocono Mountains
NASCAR races at Pocono Raceway
IMSA GT Championship circuits
Buildings and structures in Monroe County, Pennsylvania
Tourist attractions in Monroe County, Pennsylvania
1971 establishments in Pennsylvania
Sports venues completed in 1971
Road courses in the United States